René Raymond Josset (28 July 1910 – 19 January 1979) was a French long-distance runner. He competed in the marathon at the 1948 Summer Olympics.

References

1910 births
1979 deaths
Athletes (track and field) at the 1948 Summer Olympics
French male long-distance runners
French male marathon runners
Olympic athletes of France
Athletes from Paris
20th-century French people